The Viper Room is a nightclub and live music venue located on the Sunset Strip in West Hollywood, California, United States. It was established as The Viper Room in 1993 and was partly owned by actor Johnny Depp. The other part owner was Sal Jenco who starred in 21 Jump Street with Depp. The club became known for being a hangout of the young Hollywood elite, and was the site where actor River Phoenix died of a drug overdose on the night before Halloween  in 1993. In early 1995, Australian singer and actor Jason Donovan suffered a drug-induced seizure at the club, but survived; as well as singer Courtney Love, who was given CPR by Depp after an overdose. In November 1997, Australian rock star Michael Hutchence played his last public performance in the Viper Room, a week before his suicide.

The Viper Room has undergone several changes in ownership, and continues to host music of multiple genres, including metal, punk rock, and alternative rock.

While predominantly known as a music venue, the Viper Room also hosts a lower level below the stage and audience area, which is home to a large whiskey bar.

History
The location was originally a grocery store, from 1921 into the 1940s.  In the 1940s it was converted into a nightclub called the "Cotton Club", entirely unrelated to the Harlem original. This was soon replaced by "The Greenwich Village Inn", the "Rue Angel" and finally "The Last Call" during the 1940s.  From 1951 to 1969, the location was a bar called "The Melody Lounge".  In 1969, it became "Filthy McNasty's". and in the 1980s, a jazz club called "The Central".  This nightclub was close to shutting down before Chuck E. Weiss, who had performed there for years, suggested to Depp that he should revitalize the spot and rename it "The Viper Room".  Tom Waits also had a hand in redeveloping the spot.

The venue
Despite the death of River Phoenix the year the venue opened, the club became and remained a hangout for Hollywood's most popular young actors and musicians. Adam Duritz, the lead singer of Counting Crows, worked as a Viper Room bartender in late 1994 and early 1995 to escape his newfound fame.

Ownership 
As part of the settlement of a lawsuit involving the disappearance of co-owner Anthony Fox in December 2001, Depp relinquished his ownership of the Viper Room in 2004. The club changed hands multiple times between 2004 and 2016; the club is currently owned by Viper Room Holdings, Ltd. CEO James Cooper.

Intellectual property and lawsuits
A nightclub located in Cincinnati, Ohio, was formerly called "The Viper Room". The club changed its name to "The Poison Room" on January 1, 2006, after they were told by the West Hollywood Viper Room to stop using the name. Another "Viper Room" in Portland, Oregon, has also been told to stop using the name under threat of a trademark lawsuit, with the Viper Room's former owner claiming "Every dollar they make is the result of using our name."  Additionally, there is a legal brothel in Brisbane, Australia called  "The Viper Room". There is also a nightclub in Stockholm, Sweden, "as well as ones in Harrogate, UK, Vienna, Austria, and another in Sheffield UK similarly named." Until February 2009 there was a nightclub with the same name in Melbourne, Australia; it was closed down due to a spate of violent incidents that included two shootings as well as license breaches and the arrest of a co-owner on drug charges. On April 16, 2011, a nightclub named "The Viper Room" opened its doors in the city of Nijmegen in the Netherlands. The club is named after the club in Hollywood and is decorated in the same style as the American club. In 2016, The Viper Room began issuing cease and desist notices to bootleg merchandise sellers on eBay and other online storefronts.

The original building where the club is currently located is slated to be demolished by 2023, to make way for a replacement club, retail and a five star hotel tower.

Performers
At Depp's request, Tom Petty and the Heartbreakers performed on the club's opening night.

Johnny Cash performed at the venue, debuting material that would later appear on American Recordings (1994). In 1997, the Viper Room was also a place of a few early solo live performances by John Frusciante at the time of his bad physical condition caused by drug abuse. 

Other performers include Avril Lavigne, Neurotic Outsiders (featuring Duff McKagan, The Penfifteen Club, Steve Jones and John Taylor), Keanu Reeves (who performed there with his band Dogstar in 1997), The Cult, Slash, X, Julliette and the Licks, Concrete Blonde, Green Day, Courtney Love, Hole, Joey Ramone, Tenacious D, and The Strokes.

In film 
In the 1983 film Valley Girl, the building (then housing a nightclub called The Central) was used for scenes featuring the new-wave band the Plimsouls. In Oliver Stone's film The Doors (1991), the building was used as a filming location for scenes depicting the London Fog, also of West Hollywood. London Fog was a lesser-known nightclub halfway up the same block from the Whisky a Go Go where the Doors had their first regular gigs for four months in early 1966.

The 2003 Charlie's Angels: Full Throttle "Pink Panther Dance" scene was filmed at the club, though the club's name was changed in the film to "The Treasure Chest".

Several scenes in the 2005 John Travolta film Be Cool were set at or in the club, although only the exterior of the site was used in the shoot.

The Viper Room is also featured in the 2004 documentary Dig! when members of the band the Brian Jonestown Massacre began brawling with each other on stage while performing.

The Viper Room was once the base of an underground poker ring, reportedly founded by actor Tobey Maguire. The ring often included other actors such as Ben Affleck, Leonardo DiCaprio, and Matt Damon. The poker ring inspired the 2017 movie Molly's Game, starring Jessica Chastain.
The Viper Room's latest feature has been in the new hit series ‘Pam & Tommy’ (featuring Lily James and Sebastian Stan), which details an altercation between Tommy Lee and two other bathroom goers, confirming the bar's popularity amongst the rock scene in the early nineties which still continues through to this day.

In popular culture 
The Viper Room is featured in an episode of paranormal series Ghost Adventures as one of their lockdown locations, where they investigated the building for two days. In 2019, BuzzFeed Unsolved Supernatural filmed an episode in the club.
The Viper Room basement is the setting for the initial set of poker games Molly Bloom hosted.
In 2019, the music video for the song "Blow" by Ed Sheeran, Chris Stapleton, and Bruno Mars was filmed at the Viper Room.
In 2021, the Viper Room was the feature of season 1, episode 2 of Vice Media's Dark Side of the 90's entitled "The Viper Room: Hollywood's Sanctuary."
Outsider musician Wesley Willis' song "The Viper Room" (found on the Greatest Hits, Vol. 3 compilation album) is about the club. Willis' performances at the club and the death of River Phoenix outside the venue are referenced in the lyrics.
In Spook Country, a 2006 novel by William Gibson, a character uses the sidewalk outside of the Viper Room as part of a GPS/ virtual reality art installation.

See also

Rainbow Bar and Grill
Rodney Bingenheimer's English Disco
The Roxy Theatre
Sunset Strip
Whisky a Go Go

References

External links

Viper Room official website

Buildings and structures in West Hollywood, California
Landmarks in Los Angeles
Nightclubs in Los Angeles County, California
1993 establishments in California
Johnny Depp